Blackout is a 2007 American film about the Northeast Blackout of 2003 in New York City. The film is written and directed by Jerry Lamothe, and it stars Jeffrey Wright, Zoe Saldana, Prodigy, Michael B. Jordan, and LaTanya Richardson. The film premiered at the 2007 Zurich Film Festival. It debuted on BET on February 1, 2008. It was released to DVD on February 4, 2008. The film was also screened at the Tribeca Film Festival.

Plot
Blackout is about the events that take place for two days in the summer, when a forgotten Brooklyn neighborhood experiences blackout during the blackout of 2003. It is based on true incidents.

Cast
 Jeffrey Wright as Nelson
 Zoe Saldana as Claudine
 Melvin Van Peebles as George
 Michael B. Jordan as C.J.
 LaTanya Richardson Jackson as Mrs. Thompson
 Saul Rubinek as Sol
 Sean Blakemore as James
 Susan Kelechi Watson as Fatima        
 Jamie Hector as Rasheed
 Turron Kofi Alleyne as Khalil
 Kisha Batista as Cam
 Robert Brickle-Tate as Tyrone
 Anthony Chisholm as "Toothless Tone"
 Lloyd DeLeon as Uniform Cop
 Jamie Hector as Rasheed
 Nehal Joshi as Ali
 Jerry Lamothe as Rick
 Barbara Montgomery as Mrs. Germaine
 Khalida Outlaw as Dedra
 Sara Pickett as Keisha
 Prodigy as "Sin"
 Omar Scroggins as L'
 Johnny Solo as Anthony
 Tobias Truvillion as Reggie
 Ali A. Wahhab as "Wisdom"
 Vernon "Dyverse" Wooten as "Tech"
 Yury Yakor as Russian Electronics Store Owner
 Marjorie Jean as Marketing Presenter

References

External links
 
 

2007 films
2000s English-language films